ZeroZeroZero is an Italian crime drama television series. 

ZeroZeroZero may also refer to:

 ZeroZeroZero (book), a 2013 study by Roberto Saviano that is the basis for the TV series
 ZeroZeroZero (album), a 2020 soundtrack of the TV series by Mogwai
 Zero Zero Zero, a 1998 album by Sam Phillips